Suatu is a commune in Cluj County, Transylvania, Romania. It is composed of three villages: Aruncuta (Aranykút), Dâmburile (Dombokfalva) and Suatu.
 

At the 2011 census, 48.2% of inhabitants were ethnic Hungarians, 39.6% ethnic Romanians and 9.4% ethnic Romani.

References

Communes in Cluj County
Localities in Transylvania